Jacques Erwin (born Herwin Frédéric Roger Follot; 22 December 1908 – 7 April 1957) was a French film and stage actor.

Filmography 

 1931: Moon Over Morocco by Julien Duvivier as Midlock
 1931: Tossing Ship by Jean de La Cour as an officier
 1933: L'atroce menace by Christian-Jaque 
 1933: Vilaine histoire by Christian-Jaque 
 1934: Liliom by Fritz Lang as the suicidé
 1934: Lui ou elle by Roger Capellani 
 1934: Perfidie by Roger Capellani 
 1935: Stradivarius by Géza von Bolváry as an officer
 1936: La brigade en jupons by Jean de Limur as Mr. Vilette
 1936: J'arrose mes galons by René Pujol and Jacques Darmont
 1936: Street of Shadows by G. W. Pabst
 1937: The Red Dancer or La Chèvre aux pieds d'or by Jean-Paul Paulin
 1937: Ramuntcho by René Barberis as Arrochkoa
 1937: Les Nuits blanches de Saint-Pétersbourg by Jean Dréville as colonel Toukatchewsky
 1938: Frères corses by Géo Kolber
 1938: Katia by Maurice Tourneur as Trubetzkoïy 
 1938: La maison du maltais de Pierre Chenal as Laurent
 1938: Remontons les Champs-Elysées by Sacha Guitry and Robert Bibal as Louis XIV young and the duke of Montpensier 1939: Nine Bachelors by Sacha Guitry as the duke Julien of Bénéval
 1939: There's No Tomorrow by Max Ophüls
 1940: L'An 40 by Fernand Rivers as Jacques
 1940: The Marvelous Night by Jean-Paul Paulin as the Le forgeron
 1940: Un chapeau de paille d'Italie by Maurice Cammage as Emile
 1941: Les petits riens by Raymond Leboursier as Alceste
 1943: La Rabouilleuse by Fernand Rivers as Maxime Gillet
 1947: Capitaine Blomet by Andrée Feix as Mr. de Cugnac
 1947: Les jeux sont faits by Jean Delannoy as Jean Aguerra
 1947: La Grande Volière by Georges Peclet as the colonel 
 1949: Forbidden to the Public by Alfred Pasquali as Hervé Montagné 
 1950: Garou-Garou, le passe-muraille by Jean Boyer as Gaston the stepbrother 
 1951: Gibier de potence by Roger Richebé 
 1953: L'Étrange Désir de monsieur Bard by Geza Radvanyi as l'huissier du casino 
 1955: Marguerite de la nuit by Claude Autant-Lara as the tenor

 Theatre 
 1934: Une femme libre by Armand Salacrou, directed by Paulette Pax, Théâtre de l'Œuvre
 1935: La Complainte de Pranzini et de Thérèse de Lisieux by Henri Ghéon, directed by Georges Pitoëff, Théâtre des Mathurins
 1936: Elizabeth, la femme sans homme by André Josset, directed by René Rocher, Théâtre du Vieux-Colombier
 1937: Victoria Regina by Laurence Housman, directed by André Brulé, Théâtre de la Madeleine
 1938: Victoria Regina by Laurence Housman, directed by André Brulé, Théâtre des Célestins
 1945: L'Autre Aventure by Marcel Haedrich, directed by Jacques Erwin, Théâtre l'Apollo
 1948: Interdit au public by Roger Dornès and Jean Marsan, directed by Alfred Pasquali, Comédie-Wagram
 1950: Mon bébé by Maurice Hennequin after Baby mine by Margaret Mayo, directed by Christian-Gérard, Théâtre de la Porte-Saint-Martin
 1951: Je l'aimais trop by Jean Guitton, directed by Christian-Gérard, Théâtre Saint-Georges
 1953: Les Pavés du ciel by Albert Husson, directed by Christian-Gérard, Théâtre des Célestins
 1955: Un monsieur qui attend'' by Emlyn Williams, directed by Pierre Dux, Comédie-Caumartin

External links 
 

French male stage actors
French male film actors
Male actors from Paris
1908 births
1957 deaths